Anatoly Laryukov (born October 28, 1970) is a Russian and Belarusian judoka. At the 2000 Summer Olympics he won the bronze medal in the men's lightweight (66–73 kg) category, together with Vsevolods Zelonijs of Latvia. This was Belarus' first-ever Olympic medal in the sport.

Career 
He finished his career in 2004. Since 2013 — the Chief of Department of Russian Judo Federation.

Achievements 

The bronze medal winner of the Olympic Games in Sydney (2000) 
The first Belarus judoka who won a medal in the Olympic Games.
The participant of the Olympic Games in Athens 2004.

References 

 1-st CIS Championships results
 Belarus Judo
 The Famous Men's of Arhonskaya
 Database Olympics
 Videos Laryukov vs Maddaloni

External links
 
 
 

Russian male judoka
Belarusian male judoka
1970 births
Living people
Judoka at the 2000 Summer Olympics
Judoka at the 2004 Summer Olympics
Olympic judoka of Belarus
Olympic bronze medalists for Belarus
Sportspeople from Vladikavkaz
Olympic medalists in judo
Medalists at the 2000 Summer Olympics